The Hoodoo Hills are a mountain range in Glenn County, California.

References 

Mountain ranges of Glenn County, California